Mikhail Alexandrovich Gorchakov (1839 — 1897) was a Russian diplomat and the son of the nobleman, foreign minister, and last Chancellor of the Russian Empire, Prince Alexander Gorchakov. He represented the Russian Empire as its ambassador in Bern, Switzerland (1872–78), in Dresden, Saxony (1878–79), and in Madrid, Spain (1879–96).

References

1839 births
1897 deaths
Ambassadors of Russia to Switzerland
Ambassadors of Russia to Spain
Mikhail Alexandrovich
Diplomats of the Russian Empire
Privy Councillor (Russian Empire)